Ivica Radić (born 8 September 1990) is a Croatian professional basketball player for Trefl Sopot of the Polish Basketball League.

Professional career
He signed with Cremona on 17 September 2021. However, he parted ways with the team on 15 October 2021, after appearing in two games.

On November 15, 2022, he signed with Trefl Sopot of the Polish Basketball League.

References

1990 births
Living people
Basket Ferentino players
Basket Zielona Góra players
BC Levski Sofia players
Brussels Basketball players
Croatian men's basketball players
Croatian expatriate basketball people in Bulgaria
Fortitudo Pallacanestro Bologna players
KK Alkar players
KK Kaštela players
KK Kvarner 2010 players
KK Split players
KK Zadar players
KK Zagreb players
KK Włocławek players
Pallacanestro Cantù players
Power forwards (basketball)
Reyer Venezia players
S.L. Benfica basketball players
Trefl Sopot players
Vanoli Cremona players
Veroli Basket players
Viola Reggio Calabria players
ZTE KK players